Colombia competed at the 2022 World Games held in Birmingham, United States from 7 to 17 July 2022. Athletes representing Colombia won nine gold medals, ten silver medals and six bronze medals. The country finished in 9th place in the medal table.

Medalists

Competitors
The following is the list of number of competitors in the Games.

Archery

Colombia won two medals in archery.

Artistic roller skating

Colombia won one bronze medal in artistic roller skating.

Bowling

Colombia won one silver medal in bowling.

Cue sports

Colombia won one silver medal in cue sports.

Duathlon

Colombia competed in duathlon.

Finswimming

Colombia won six medals in finswimming.

Flying disc

Colombia won the bronze medal in the flying disc competition.

Inline hockey

Colombia competed in the inline hockey tournament.

Ju-jitsu

Colombia won one silver medal in ju-jitsu.

Racquetball

Colombia competed in racquetball.

Road speed skating

Colombia won four medals in road speed skating.

Squash

Colombia won one bronze medal in squash.

Track speed skating

Colombia won seven medals in track speed skating.

Water skiing

Colombia competed in water skiing.

References

Nations at the 2022 World Games
2022
World Games